Govgil (an abbreviation for גבלה גאולה, "govleh geulah"; Juhuri: govlei geulya, "end/verge/completion of (the celebration of) the redemption") is a celebration of the Mountain Jews next day after the end of the celebration of Pesach (Passover), i.e., on the eighth day after the beginning of Pesach.

See also
Mimouna
Yad#Mountain Jews

References

Mountain Jews
Passover